Anzal-e Jonubi Rural District is in Anzal District of Urmia County, West Azerbaijan province, Iran. At the National Census of 2006, its population was 19,482 in 4,197 households. There were 20,605 inhabitants in 4,993 households at the following census of 2011. At the most recent census of 2016, the population of the rural district was 20,560 in 5,076 households. The largest of its 34 villages was Qulonji, with 5,192 people.

References 

Urmia County

Rural Districts of West Azerbaijan Province

Populated places in West Azerbaijan Province

Populated places in Urmia County